Cerro Otto is a mountain located  from San Carlos de Bariloche, and inside the Nahuel Huapí National Park, in Patagonia, Argentina.

Etymology
It took its name from German pioneer Otto Goedecke, who arrived to Bariloche in 1892 and dwelled nearby.

History
There is a restaurant that revolves on the summit. The revolving restaurant is the Giratoria confectionery, and there is also a "Refugio del cerro Otto" grill which makes bondiola sandwiches.

Description

Due to its prominence, Cerro Otto is notably a visual reference while navigating the city as it stands in between the neighbourhoods of San Joaquin, Los Cipresales, Las Vertientes, Los Maitenes, Melipal, El Faldeo, Parque Cerro Otto, Virgen Misionera, Peumayen (colloquially known as "the kilometers") from the North and El Frutillar, 645 Viviendas, Lomas del Cauquen, and Arelauquen Country Club from the South.

On top of the mountain a rotating cafeteria owned by the Sara María Furman Foundation is most prominent, constituting a notable lookout overlooking the city, Nahuel Huapi and Gutiérrez lakes,  and the Andes.

Gallery

See also 
 Cerro Catedral
 Cerro Campanario
 Cerro Bellavista
 Cerro Ventana
 Cerro Carbón

References

External links 

Mountains of Argentina
Landforms of Río Negro Province
Tourist attractions in Río Negro Province
Bariloche
Nahuel Huapi National Park